Längtan (English: Longing) is the debut album of Swedish Europop group Timoteij. The lead single, "Kom", written and produced by Niclas Arn, Karl Eurén and Gustav Eurén, peaked at the Swedish Top 60 Singles chart at number two. "Kom" finished in first place in the third semi-final of Melodifestivalen 2010 and fifth in the national final.

Upon the release of the album, it debuted at number one on the Swedish Albums Chart.

Track listing

Release history

Charts and certifications

Weekly charts

Year-end charts

Certifications

References

2010 debut albums
Timoteij albums